Stéphane Moulin (born 4 August 1967) is a French professional football manager and former player. He was appointed as manager of Ligue 2 club Caen in June 2021.

Club career
Moulin began his playing career with Angers in 1984 and went on to make 127 league appearances in six seasons with the club. Between 1990 and 1992, he played 51 games and scored nine goals for Châteauroux. After leaving Châteauroux, Moulin spent five years with Châtellerault, during which time he scored eleven goals in 129 league appearances.

Managerial career
Following his retirement in 1997, Moulin was appointed as manager of Châtellerault, a position he held for eight seasons. At the start of the 2005–06 season he was hired by his former club, Angers, to manage the reserve team. He initially shared the position with Gilles Kerhuiel, but continued alone after Kerhuiel left in 2006 to continue his playing career. In the summer of 2011, Moulin was promoted to first-team manager following the departure of Jean-Louis Garcia to Lens.

On 26 March 2021, Moulin announced that he would be leaving Angers at the end of the season, putting an end to his ten-year spell as manager of the club. He had been the longest-continuously-serving manager of any club in Europe's top five leagues.

On 4 June 2021, Moulin was announced as the new manager of Stade Malherbe Caen, signing a contract until 2024.

Personal life 
In September 2021, Moulin publicly denounced an allegation of racism and religious discrimination from investigative reporter Romain Molina. Moulin declared his intention to lodge a legal complaint.

Managerial statistics

Honours
Châtellerault
Championnat de France Amateur Group D runners-up: 2004–05

Angers
Coupe de France runner-up: 2016–17

References

External links

1967 births
Living people
Footballers from Paris
French footballers
French football managers
Association football midfielders
Angers SCO players
LB Châteauroux players
Ligue 2 players
Angers SCO managers
Stade Malherbe Caen managers
SO Châtellerault players
Ligue 1 managers
Ligue 2 managers